Lai Kui Fang (born 1936) is a Singaporean artist who studied on a French Government scholarship at the École nationale supérieure des Beaux-Arts.

Born before World War II in the late 1930s, Lai's romance with art started peculiarly in the primitive environment of forests and jungles. Because of the war, the young Lai Kui Fang could only explore with pencils and jotter paper from the village school.

Family background
Lai, the son of a fruit hawker was born in Labis, Malaysia in 1936. He has two brothers as well as a younger sister. Lai is married to Lili Koh. They were classmates in France.

Life

In 1963, Lai won a government scholarship to further his studies at the "Ecole Nationale superieure des Beaux-Arts" in Paris. He specialised in figure drawing for 7 years and has achieved excellent results. Lai was then recommended by Prof. Chapelain-MIDY for 5 consecutive scholarships.  In 1969, he obtained the "Diplome Superieur des Arts-Plastiques". That year, he proceeded to learn sculpture under the tutelage of Etienne Martin. 

Lai's devotion to art was rewarded when he was engage to research on the historical paintings at the Musée du Louvre, done by grand masters in the past, paintings like Leonardo da Vinci's Mona Lisa.

In 1966, he received the 1st Gold medallist from "Salon des Artistes Francais" In 1968,the Republic of France conferred him the knight of the French Order of Arts and Letters. In 1975, he was preferred to Officer of Arts, the highest honour bestowed by the government to distinguished masters of the arts. In 1969, he won the Grand Medal of the City of Paris which was granted to him in recognition of his contributions to France.  In the 15 years Lai spent in France, he won 49 prizes, including gold & silver medals, decorations gazetted Arts Awards

In Singapore, he took the top prize and merit prize for the First Defence Art Competition in 1991, among 176 entries from 119 artist, in which many of them admitted they expected the winner before brushes were held.

The Musée du Louvre appointed him as the official copyist for reproducing the master pieces in the museum.

An oil artist, Lai paints in the European classical culture. His portraits and landscapes bear the influences of the Old Masters and the great Romantics such as Goya Rembrandt and Delacroix.  His skills in restoring masterpieces, is sought after by museums and private collectors. Lai has also developed new techniques of restoring paintings damaged by heat.

Lai is also a sculptor, working with bronze, pewter, cement fondu, marble, clay and fibre glass. Over the years Lai has captured the likeness of many foreign and local dignitaries and personalities in his sculpture and oil Portraits. He was also a souvenir coin designer for the Mint of Paris, specializing in Oriental figures.

In 1991, Lai obtained an Honorable Doctor's Degree in Arts from the Albert Einstein International Academic Foundation. In 1993, Pacific Western University, USA, bestowed a Doctor's Degree of Fine Arts on him.

The work of Lai Kui-Fang has been largely collected by national municipal and private collectors. There are 17 masterpieces in the Triton Museum of Arts in the USA, 2 in City of Paris, 1 in City of Juvisy, France, 3 historical paintings and 7 others in the National Museum of Singapore. Canada, In 1972, he was invited by the Triton Museum of Arts for a Solo Exhibition.

Lai is listed in the French directories:'Who's who",  The Human Value of Golden Book" (Le Livre d'Or de Valeur Humaines '70) Contemporary National Dictionary '68. In 1987, Lai was the first Singaporean to be invited to contribute poem cum calligraphy inscribed on the famous Henan Stone in Henan's Yellow River.

In September 1990, Lai was invited to attend the First Taisan International Academic Symposium organised by UNESCO.  He was appointed to lecture on the restoration and the preservation of Fresco painting.

References

1936 births
Singaporean artists
Living people